Zhang Xunwei (Chinese: 张迅伟; born 28 February 1989 in Liaoning) is a Chinese football player.

Club career
In 2006, Zhang Xunwei started his professional footballer career with Shenzhen Ruby in the Chinese Super League. He would eventually make his league debut for Shenzhen on 17 April 2009 in a game against Shanghai Shenhua.
On 4 January 2015, Zhang transferred to Chinese Super League side Shanghai Shenxin.

In March 2017, Zhang transferred to League Two side Jiangxi Liansheng.

Career statistics 
Statistics accurate as of match played 31 December 2020.

Honours

Club
Shenyang Urban
 China League Two: 2019

References

External links

1989 births
Living people
Chinese footballers
Footballers from Shenyang
Shenzhen F.C. players
Shanghai Shenxin F.C. players
Jiangxi Beidamen F.C. players
Liaoning Shenyang Urban F.C. players
Chinese Super League players
China League One players
China League Two players
Association football goalkeepers